Ellen Marie Arruda is an American mechanical engineer known for her research on the mechanical properties of polymers and on tissue engineering, with applications including the design of improved football helmets, artificial tooth enamel that can withstand high-shock and high-vibration environments, and nanolayered composite materials that are lightweight, as strong as steel, and transparent. The Arruda–Boyce model for the behavior of rubber-like polymers is named for her and her doctoral advisor Mary Cunningham Boyce, with whom she published it in 1993. She is Maria Comninou Collegiate Professor of Mechanical Engineering and Tim Manganello / Borg Warner Department Chair of Mechanical Engineering at the University of Michigan.

Education and career
Arruda earned bachelor's and master's degrees in engineering at Pennsylvania State University in 1985 and 1988, and completed a Ph.D. in mechanical engineering at the Massachusetts Institute of Technology in 1992. Her dissertation, Characterization of the Strain Hardening Response of Amorphous Polymers, was supervised by Mary Cunningham Boyce.

She joined the University of Michigan Department of Mechanical Engineering and Applied Mechanics and Department of Macromolecular Science and Engineering as an assistant professor in 1992, became a full professor in 2005, and added an affiliation as a professor in the Department of Biomedical Engineering in 2009.

Recognition
Arruda was named a Fellow of the American Society of Mechanical Engineers and of the Society of Engineering Science in 2008, and of the American Academy of Mechanics in 2010. She was elected to the National Academy of Engineering in 2017 "for pioneering research in polymer and tissue mechanics and their application in innovative commercial products".

She was the 2018 winner of the James R. Rice Medal of the Society of Engineering Science, "for substantial contributions to the mechanics of engineering polymers and biological materials, with both fundamental and applied impact", and the 2019 winner of the Nadai Medal of the American Society of Mechanical Engineers.

References

External links
Home page

Year of birth missing (living people)
Living people
American mechanical engineers
American women engineers
Penn State College of Engineering alumni
MIT School of Engineering alumni
University of Michigan faculty
Fellows of the American Society of Mechanical Engineers
Members of the United States National Academy of Engineering
American women academics
21st-century American women